The individual competition of the nordic combined events at the 2012 Winter Youth Olympics in Innsbruck, Austria, was held on January 15, at the Seefeld Arena with one ski jump and a 10 kilometre cross-country race. 17 athletes from 17 different countries took part in this event.

Results

Ski jumping

Cross-country

References

Nordic combined at the 2012 Winter Youth Olympics